Mirzanaq (also Romanized as Mīrzānaq; also known as Mīrrānaq) is a village in Minabad Rural District, Anbaran District, Namin County, Ardabil Province, Iran. At the 2006 census, its population was 555, in 112 families.

References 

Towns and villages in Namin County